Salanoia is a genus of euplerid carnivoran with two currently described species found in Madagascar. They are mongoose-like, which is reflected in the older versions of their English names, for example brown-tailed mongoose which is now called brown-tailed vontsira. The name Salanoia is derived from salano, one of the vernacular names for Salanoia concolor.

Vontsira is a Malagasy vernacular name that seems to apply to a few local species of local mongoose-like carnivores in the related genera Salanoia, Galidia, and Galidictis.

References

External links
 

Euplerids
Mammal genera
 
 
Taxa named by John Edward Gray
Taxonomy articles created by Polbot